The Airdrome Nieuport 28 is an American amateur-built aircraft, designed and produced by Airdrome Aeroplanes, of Holden, Missouri. The aircraft is supplied as a kit for amateur construction.

The aircraft is a full-scale replica of the First World War French Nieuport 28 fighter. The replica is built from modern materials and powered by modern engines.

Design and development
The Airdrome Nieuport 28 features a strut-braced biplane layout, a single-seat open cockpit, fixed conventional landing gear and a single engine in tractor configuration.

The aircraft is made from aluminum tubing and gussets which are pull riveted together. Its flying surfaces covered in aircraft fabric. The kit is made up of twelve sub-kits. The standard engine used is the  four stroke Rotec R2800 radial engine. Building time from the factory-supplied kit is estimated at 500 hours by the manufacturer.

Operational history
Two examples had been completed by December 2011.

Specifications (Nieuport 28)

References

Homebuilt aircraft
Single-engined tractor aircraft